"The Ballad of Paladin" is a song written by Johnny Western, Richard Boone, and Sam Rolfe and performed by Duane Eddy. The song reached No. 10 on the UK Singles Chart and No. 33 on the Billboard Hot 100 in 1962. Members of the Western Writers of America chose it as one of the Top 100 Western songs of all time. Eddy's flip side was the theme to The Wild Westerners.

The song was produced by Lee Hazlewood and arranged by Bob Thompson.  Drummer Earl Palmer played on the session.

It was used heavily in the film Stand by Me.

Charts

Other versions
Johnny Western recorded the original version in 1958 that was the regular theme to the television show Have Gun – Will Travel from the second season on--it was used at least four times in season 1, including episodes 33 & 34. His co-writers were the show's star and creator.  Years later, he recorded a parody, "The Ballad of Palindrome", with the western swing and comedy group Riders in the Sky.
Al Caiola released a version as part of an EP in 1962.
Faron Young released a version as part of an EP in 1963.

References

1962 songs
1962 singles
Duane Eddy songs
Faron Young songs
Song recordings produced by Lee Hazlewood
RCA Records singles
Television drama theme songs